The Combat Infantryman Badge (CIB) is a United States Army military decoration. The badge is awarded to infantrymen and Special Forces soldiers in the rank of colonel and below, who fought in active ground combat while assigned as members of either an Infantry or Special Forces unit of brigade size or smaller at any time after 6 December 1941. For those soldiers who are not members of an infantry, or Special Forces unit, the Combat Action Badge (CAB) is awarded instead. For soldiers with an MOS in the medical field they would, with the exception of a Special Forces Medical Sergeant (18D), receive the Combat Medical Badge. 18D Special Forces Medics would receive the Combat Infantryman badge instead.

The CIB and its non-combat contemporary, the Expert Infantryman Badge (EIB), were created in November 1943 during World War II to boost morale and increase the prestige of service in the Infantry. Specifically, it recognizes the inherent sacrifices of all infantrymen, and that they face a greater risk of being wounded or killed in action than any other military occupational specialties.

History
After the United States' declaration of war in 1941, the War Department had difficulty in recruiting soldiers into the Infantry branch in the case when men were given the opportunity to choose their branch of assignment, and the morale of soldiers in the Infantry Branch remained low, namely due to the fact that "[o]f all Soldiers [sic], it was recognized that the infantryman continuously operated under the worst conditions and performed a mission that was not assigned to any other Soldier [sic] or unit...[t]he infantry, a small portion of the total Armed Forces, was suffering the most casualties while receiving the least public recognition." Lt. Gen. Lesley J. McNair, commanding officer of the U.S. Army Ground Forces, championed the idea of creating an award recognizing the unique dangers faced by infantrymen.

On 27 October 1943, the War Department formally established the Combat Infantryman Badge (CIB) and the Expert Infantryman Badge (EIB) awards in Section I, War Department Circular 269:

The present war has demonstrated the importance of highly-proficient, tough, hard, and aggressive infantry, which can be obtained only by developing a high degree of individual all-around proficiency on the part of every infantryman. As a means of attaining the high standards desired and to foster esprit de corps in infantry units; the Expert Infantryman and the Combat Infantryman badges are established for infantry personnel.

Moreover, War Department Circular 269 stipulated: "...only one of these badges will be worn at one time" and "the Combat Infantryman badge is the highest award"; the awarding of the CIB was officially authorized with an executive order dated 15 November 1943; later, on 30 June 1944, the U.S. Congress approved an extra ten dollars in monthly pay to every infantryman awarded the CIB—excepting commissioned officers. The World War II regulations did not formally prescribe a specific combat service period establishing the infantryman's eligibility for being awarded a Combat Infantryman Badge, thus, in 1947, the U.S. government implemented a policy authorizing the retroactive awarding of the Bronze Star Medal to World War II veteran soldiers who had been awarded the Combat Infantryman Badge, because the CIB was awarded only to soldiers who had borne combat duties befitting the recognition conferred by a Bronze Star Medal. Both awards required a commander's recommendation and a citation in the pertinent orders. General Marshall initiated this after Medal of Honor–recipient Major Charles W. Davis noted to him that: "It would be wonderful, if someone could design a badge for every infantryman who faces the enemy, every day and every night, with so little recognition".

War Department Circular 105, dated 13 March 1944 amended WD Circular 269.  Page 2, paragraph IV. BADGE – Section 1, Circular No. 269 War Department, 1943, is amended by adding paragraph 8 as follows:

8. Retroactive award of Expert and Combat Infantryman badges may be awarded to any infantryman who, on or after 6 December 1941, has established eligibility and been recommended for such award under the provisions of paragraph 2b or paragraph 3b.  The Expert Infantryman badge may be awarded under paragraph 2a, only to those infantryman who have established eligibility and been recommended for such award on or after 27 October 1943.

From the beginning, Army leaders have taken care to retain the badge for the unique purpose for which it was established and to prevent the adoption of any other badge that would lower its prestige. At the close of World War II, the largest war in which armor and artillery played key roles in the ground campaigns, a review was conducted of the CIB criteria with consideration being given to creating either additional badges or authorizing the badge to cavalry and armor units.  The review noted that any change in policy would detract from the prestige of the badge.

Eligibility requirements
A soldier must meet the following requirements to be awarded the Combat Infantryman Badge:
 Be an infantryman satisfactorily performing infantry duties
 Assigned to an infantry unit during such time as the unit is engaged in active ground combat
 Actively participate in such ground combat

Campaign or battle credit alone is not sufficient for award of the CIB.  The specific eligibility criteria for the CIB require that an officer (SSI 11 or 18) in the grade of colonel or below, or an Army enlisted soldier or warrant officer with an infantry or Special Forces MOS, who subsequent to 6 December 1941 has satisfactorily performed duty while assigned or attached as a member of an infantry, ranger or special forces unit of brigade, regimental, or smaller size during any period such unit was engaged in active ground combat. Eligibility also includes soldiers or officers with an MOS other than infantry or Special Forces that hold a prior or secondary infantry or Special Forces MOS and that are assigned or temporarily attached to an infantry unit of any size smaller than a brigade. Eligibility for Special Forces personnel in Military Occupational Specialties (MOS) 18B, 18C, 18E, 18F, and 18Z (less Special Forces medical sergeant) accrues from 20 December 1989.  Retroactive awards of the CIB to Special Forces personnel are not authorized prior to 20 December 1989.  A recipient must be personally present and under hostile fire while serving in an assigned infantry or Special Forces primary duty, in a unit actively engaged in ground combat with the enemy.  The unit in question can be of any size smaller than brigade.

On or after 18 September 2001: a soldier must be an Army infantry or special forces officer (SSI 11 or 18) in the grade of Colonel or below, or an Army enlisted soldier or warrant officer with an infantry or special forces MOS, who has satisfactorily performed duty while assigned or attached as a member of an infantry, ranger or special forces unit of brigade, regimental, or smaller size during any period such unit was engaged in active ground combat.  A soldier must be personally present and under fire while serving in an assigned infantry or Special Forces primary duty, in a unit engaged in active ground combat, to close with and destroy the enemy with direct fires. Army soldiers possessing MOS of 18D (Special Forces Medical Sergeant) who satisfactorily perform special forces duties while assigned or attached to a special forces unit of brigade, regimental, or smaller size during any period such unit was engaged in active ground combat may be awarded the CIB.  These soldiers must have been personally present and engaged in active ground combat, to close with and destroy the enemy with direct fires. Retroactive awards under these criteria are not authorized for service prior to 18 September 2001.  Those soldiers possessing MOS of 18D who qualify for award of the CMB from 18 September 2001 to 3 June 2005 will remain qualified for the badge.

Qualifying conflicts, operations and periods

The CIB is authorized for award for the following qualifying wars, conflicts, and operations. To date, a separate award of the CIB has been authorized for qualified soldiers in the following qualifying periods:

World War II (7 December 1941 to 3 September 1945)
Korean War (27 June 1950 to 27 July 1953)
Vietnam War and other operations (2 March 1961 to 10 March 1995)
 Vietnam War (2 March 1961 to 28 March 1973) combined with qualifying service in Laos (19 April 1961 to 6 October 1962)
 Dominican Republic (28 April 1965 to 1 September 1966)
 South Korea on the demilitarized zone (DMZ) (4 January 1969 to 31 March 1994)
 El Salvador (1 January 1981 to 1 February 1992)
 Grenada (23 October to 21 November 1983)
 Joint Security Area, Panmunjom, South Korea (23 November 1984)
 Panama (20 December 1989 to 31 January 1990)
 South West Asia Conflict (Operation Desert Storm) (17 January to 11 April 1991)
 Somalia (5 June 1993 to 31 March 1994)
Global War on Terrorism (18 September 2001 to 30 August 2021)
Afghanistan (OEF, 18 September 2001 to 31 December 2014; OFS, 1 January 2015 to a date to be determined)
Iraq (OIF, 19 March 2003 to 31 August 2010; OND, 1 September 2010 to 31 December 2011)
Iraq & Syria (OIR, 15 June 2014 to a date to be determined)

NOTE: Subsequent awards of the CIB are not authorized for the same qualifying period, as outlined above. Subsequent awards of the CIB may be awarded provided the soldier has met eligibility criteria in separate Qualifying Periods/Eras. For example, a second award with superimposed star on the wreath could be awarded for a soldier who served in Somalia (3rd Qualifying Era) and OEF (4th Qualifying Era).

In the Korean War: The special requirements for award of the CIB for service in South Korea are rescinded. Army veterans and Service members who served in South Korea on or after 28 July 1953 and meet the criteria for award of the CIB may submit an application (to include supporting documentation) for award of the CIB.

Badge design
The original, World War II–model CIB was a silver and enamel badge, consisting of a  rectangular bar with an infantry-blue field upon which is superimposed a Springfield Arsenal Musket, Model 1795. The composite device is superimposed to an elliptic oak-leaf wreath, symbolizing steadfast character, strength, and loyalty. During World War II, there existed metallic, composite models of the CIB composed of a separate EIB rectangle-badge and oak-leaf wreath that then was pinned to the blouse, as a Combat Infantryman Badge. Later, a matte-black subdued metal badge was created for wearing on the fatigues in the field. Since World War II, the CIB has been made in cloth (colored and subdued) for wear, like the matte-metal model, on the fatigue field uniform, and, a miniature (1.25 inches long) lacquered-metal CIB model is available for wearing on the mess dress uniform and civilian clothes.

On 8 February 1952, the Army approved the addition of stars to the CIB indicating the soldier's having fought in more than one war. The first was the second-award CIB recognizing Korean War combat operations; in that time, the U.S. Army's Institute of Heraldry also had created eighth-award CIB designs. The second- through fourth-award CIB awards were indicated with silver five-point stars, one to three stars centered, at badge's top, between the tips of the oak-leaf wreath; the fifth- through eighth-awards of the CIB were indicated with gold stars.  However, Army Regulation 600-8-22 (Military Awards) only authorizes up to three awards of the CIB. There are four periods for which an award of the badge can be made:

 World War II (7 December 1941 to 3 September 1945)
 Korean War (27 June 1950 to 27 July 1953)
 Vietnam War and other Cold War era actions (2 March 1961 to 10 March 1995)
 War on Terror (18 September 2001 to a date to be determined)

Currently, the Combat Infantryman Badge is worn one-quarter (0.25") inch above the service ribbons above the left-breast pocket of the Class-A uniform coat and of the other uniforms with which the CIB is authorized. As of June 2011, the badge and its sew-on equivalent may be worn on the Army Combat Uniform (ACU).

Three-time recipients

  
The National Infantry Museum has a memorial to the soldiers who have been awarded three CIBs in the course of their Army careers.

Major General David E. Grange Jr. was the Commanding General at Fort Benning, Georgia, between 1979 and 1981.  As a triple CIB recipient himself, Grange understood that being awarded three Combat Infantryman Badges was a very rare achievement and thought a list should be compiled to celebrate the recipients' distinction.  With his urging, the National Infantry Museum at Fort Benning began collecting names of known third CIB recipients.  By 1983 the museum had collected and set to bronze the names of two hundred and thirty men and preparations were made for the unveiling of a memorial to these soldiers and the recipients yet to be discovered at Fort Benning.  An additional 94 names were added to the bronze plaques over the years.  After the inauguration of the new NIM, a new exhibit showing the list was displayed.

Because the gap between the second (Korean War) and fourth (War on Terror) periods of eligibility is more than forty-eight years, longer than any likely career in infantry or special forces units, all known three-time recipients served in World War II and the Korean and Vietnam Wars.

See also
 Badges of the United States Army
 Combat Action Ribbon (USN-USMC, USCG)
 Air Force Combat Action Medal (USAF)

References

External links
 Wear and Appearance of Army Uniforms and Insignia (AR 670-1)
 
 1795 Springfield Musket Flintlock rifle on Combat Infantryman Badge
 Third Award Of Combat Infantryman Badge FB page”

Awards and decorations of the United States Army
United States military badges